Dame Angela Eagle DBE (born 17 February 1961) is a British Labour Party politician serving as the Member of Parliament (MP) for Wallasey since 1992. Eagle was born in Yorkshire and studied PPE at the University of Oxford, before working for the CBI and then a trade union.

Eagle served as the Minister of State for Pensions and Ageing Society from June 2009 until May 2010. Eagle was elected to the Shadow Cabinet in October 2010 and was appointed by Ed Miliband to be Shadow Chief Secretary to the Treasury.

In October 2011, she was appointed Shadow Leader of the House of Commons when Miliband reshuffled his Shadow Cabinet. She was appointed as both Shadow First Secretary of State and Shadow Secretary of State for Business, Innovation and Skills in September 2015 in Jeremy Corbyn's first Shadow Cabinet. She resigned from the Shadow Cabinet in June 2016. Eagle announced a leadership challenge to Labour Party leader Jeremy Corbyn on 11 July 2016, but eight days later she withdrew leaving Owen Smith to challenge Corbyn for the leadership. Eagle is the twin sister of fellow Labour MP Maria Eagle.

She remains in the House of Commons as a backbencher.

Education and early employment
Eagle was born in Bridlington, East Riding of Yorkshire, the daughter of Shirley (Kirk), a factory worker, and André Eagle, a print worker. She was educated at St. Peter's C of E Primary School and Formby High School. She read Philosophy, politics and economics at St John's College, Oxford, graduating from the university with a second-class Bachelor of Arts degree in 1983. While at Oxford, she was chairwoman of the Oxford University Fabian Society during 1980–1983. In 1976, Eagle was joint winner of the British Girls' Under-18 chess championship.

In 1984 she worked in the economic directorate of the Confederation of British Industry (CBI), before joining the Confederation of Health Service Employees (COHSE) trade union where she held a number of positions. She was elected secretary for the Constituency Labour Party in Peckham for two years from 1989.

Parliamentary career

Backbencher and first period as government minister
Eagle was first elected to parliament as member for Wallasey in the 1992 election, defeating by 3,809 votes the Conservative Minister for Overseas Development at the Foreign Office Lynda Chalker.   Allegations were made about irregularities in her selection as parliamentary candidate, including the exclusion of a local favourite from the shortlist of candidates, and in the vote count itself.

In parliament she became a member of the Employment Select committee in 1994, and was promoted by Tony Blair in 1996 to the position of an Opposition Whip, and became a member of the Blair government following the 1997 general election as the Parliamentary Under Secretary of State at the Department for the Environment, Transport and the Regions, moving to the Department of Social Security in 1998.

Following the 2001 general election, she succeeded Mike O'Brien as an Under-Secretary of State at the Home Office. However, she was sacked by Blair in 2002, reportedly in error, and replaced by Lord Filkin.

As a backbencher, Eagle joined the Treasury Select Committee in January 2003. She voted in favour of the U.S.-led invasion of Iraq in 2003, and repeatedly against investigating it in 2003, 2006, and 2007.

Brown government minister
She returned to the government under Gordon Brown on 29 June 2007 as Exchequer Secretary to the Treasury, the most junior minister at HM Treasury. She was promoted to Minister of State at the Department for Work and Pensions in the June 2009 reshuffle.

In April 2008 Eagle took part in a debate in Parliament on the UK economy in which the Liberal Democrats tabled a motion suggesting that the country was facing an "extreme bubble in the housing market" and the "risk of recession". Eagle responded, "Fortunately for all of us … that colourful and lurid fiction has no real bearing on the macro-economic reality." A year later Jeremy Browne, who led the original debate, said her comments "summed up the Government's delusional attitude" towards warnings of financial crisis.

In opposition
Following Ed Miliband's accession to Labour Leader, Eagle was elected to his shadow cabinet, finishing tied 4th in the vote and was subsequently appointed to the  Chief Secretary to the Treasury briefing, shadowing Danny Alexander.

In April 2011, Eagle was put down in the House of Commons by Prime Minister David Cameron when he used Michael Winner's catchphrase "Calm down, dear". Eagle's colleague, deputy Labour leader Harriet Harman, said: "Women in Britain in the 21st century do not expect to be told to 'calm down, dear' by their Prime Minister", with Labour officials calling for an apology, suggesting the remark was patronising and sexist.

In the October 2011 reshuffle, Eagle became Shadow Leader of the House of Commons.

In June 2012, Eagle criticised Take That singer Gary Barlow in the House of Commons following newspaper allegations of tax avoidance made against him. Eagle criticised his recent award of the OBE and claimed in the House of Commons that Barlow had "given a whole new meaning to the phrase 'Take That'," as well as questioning why Prime Minister David Cameron had not criticised Barlow publicly in the same way he had criticised comedian Jimmy Carr for tax avoidance.

In May 2012, Eagle became chair of the Labour Party's National Policy Forum and served as chair of the party's National Executive Committee 2013–14.

Eagle, "on the vast majority of issues, votes the same way as other Labour MPs."

Deputy leadership election

Following  the resignation of Miliband and deputy Harriet Harman following Labour's defeat at the 2015 general election, Eagle stood in the Labour Party deputy leadership election.

Eagle was nominated by 32 Constituency Labour Parties and trade unions UNISON, CWU, TSSA, and UCATT and received joint support from Unite for her and fellow candidate Tom Watson. Eagle came fourth to eventual winner Tom Watson, with 16.2% in the first round, and was eliminated in the second round on 17.9% of the vote.

Corbyn shadow cabinet
Following the leadership election, Labour Party leader Jeremy Corbyn appointed Eagle as Shadow First Secretary of State and Shadow Business Secretary in September 2015.

Angela Eagle resigned from these positions on 27 June 2016 in the mass resignation of the Shadow Cabinet in the wake of the vote for Leave in the 2016 United Kingdom European Union membership referendum. Eagle had campaigned for the Remain side in the referendum.

Leadership challenge

Following the 28 June 2016 vote of no confidence by Labour MPs in Jeremy Corbyn's leadership, Eagle was reported as considering a challenge for the leadership of the Labour Party, and said she would do so if Corbyn did not resign. Eagle asserted that: "I'm not a Blairite. I'm not a Brownite... I am my own woman, a strong Labour woman." George Eaton of the New Statesman reported that backers of the other potential challenger, Owen Smith, contended that Eagle's 2003 vote in support for the Iraq War and her support for extending airstrikes against ISIS into Syria (in December 2015) might harm her bid against Corbyn, Gary Younge of The Guardian thought it was less clear what Eagle wanted in place of Corbyn's politics. Eagle announced a leadership challenge to Corbyn on 11 July, saying that "Jeremy Corbyn is unable to provide the leadership this huge task needs. I believe I can". On Tuesday 19 July 2016, Eagle announced she was withdrawing from the leadership election and would back the other candidate opposing Corbyn, Owen Smith, who had received about 20 more nominations from MPs and MEPs than she had. "We need to have a strong and united party so we can be a good opposition, take the fight to the Conservative Government and heal our country. So I am announcing that I will be supporting Owen in that endeavour with all my enthusiasm and might," Eagle said in an interview.

Eagle's Constituency  Labour Party in Wallasey were in favour of Corbyn remaining party leader and called upon Eagle to support Corbyn as leader. Her local party in Wallasey declared their support for Jeremy Corbyn as party leader "with an overwhelming majority" and proposed a vote of no-confidence in Eagle. This did not take place as the NEC decided to suspend all Labour constituency party meetings during the leadership election. With the support of Eagle, Wallasey Constituency Labour Party was suspended on 20 July 2016 over claims of bullying. An internal Labour Party investigation concerning complaints about incidents in Eagle's Constituency Labour Party and other events during her leadership campaign reported in October 2016. It confirmed that she had received homophobic abuse during a CLP annual general meeting earlier in the year. Pro-Corbyn activists strongly deny these accusations.

The day following her declaration a brick was thrown through a downstairs window at her constituency office address, and it was reported that her staff had stopped answering the telephones because of "abusive" calls. Eagle herself claimed to have received hundreds of abusive and homophobic messages at this time. It emerged on 21 July that the police have advised Eagle not to hold any open constituency surgeries over fears for her safety, advice which she has agreed to follow with regret. "It’s highly likely that the brick thrown through the window of Angela Eagle’s office was related to her leadership challenge". According to an internal party report, "[t]he position of the window made it very unlikely that this was" an action of "a random passerby" and it "was directly between two Labour offices". The claim "that the building was occupied by many companies and the window was in an unrelated stairwell" was judged to be misleading as "the landlord had a number of companies registered there; in fact the only other occupant is the landlord on the upper floor".

Personal life
Eagle was joined in the House of Commons at the 1997 general election by her twin sister, Maria Eagle. The Eagles are one of two pairs of sisters in the Commons, as of 2017. They are identical twins.

Eagle is a lesbian, coming out in a newspaper interview in September 1997. She is the second openly lesbian MP, after Maureen Colquhoun in the 1970s. In September 2008, Eagle entered into a civil partnership with Maria Exall who is also involved in the Labour Party through the National Committee.

She is an honorary associate of the National Secular Society.

Eagle was appointed Dame Commander of the Order of the British Empire (DBE) in the 2021 New Year Honours for parliamentary and political service.

Notes

References

External links

Ministerial Departures since 1997

|-

|-

|-

|-

|-

|-

|-

|-

1961 births
Living people
Alumni of St John's College, Oxford
Confederation of Health Service Employees-sponsored MPs
Female members of the Parliament of the United Kingdom for English constituencies
British identical twins
British secularists
British socialists
Chairs of the Labour Party (UK)
Dames Commander of the Order of the British Empire
Identical twin politicians
Labour Party (UK) MPs for English constituencies
Labour Friends of Israel
Lesbian feminists
Lesbian politicians
LGBT feminists
LGBT members of the Parliament of the United Kingdom
English LGBT politicians
People from Bridlington
People from Formby
British socialist feminists
English twins
UK MPs 1992–1997
UK MPs 1997–2001
UK MPs 2001–2005
UK MPs 2005–2010
UK MPs 2010–2015
UK MPs 2015–2017
UK MPs 2017–2019
UK MPs 2019–present
21st-century British women politicians
21st-century LGBT people
Women deputy opposition leaders